The 2009 Conference USA baseball tournament was the 2009 postseason college baseball championship of the NCAA Division I Conference USA, held at Pete Taylor Park in Hattiesburg, Mississippi, from May 20–May 24, 2009.  Rice won their third C-USA tournament, and received Conference USA's automatic bid to the 2009 NCAA Division I baseball tournament. The tournament consisted of eight teams, with two double-elimination brackets, and a single-game final.

Regular season results

SMU, Tulsa, and UTEP did not field baseball teams.  Memphis did not make the tournament.

Bracket

 Bold indicates the winner of the game.
 Italics indicate that the team was eliminated from the tournament.

Finish order

All-tournament team

References

External links
 2009 C-USA Baseball Championship

Tournament
Conference USA Baseball Tournament
Conference USA baseball tournament
Conference USA baseball tournament
Baseball in Mississippi
College sports in Mississippi
Hattiesburg, Mississippi
Sports competitions in Mississippi
Tourist attractions in Forrest County, Mississippi